Father (Major General) Francis Leon Sampson, USA (February 29, 1912 – January 28, 1996) was a Catholic priest from Archdiocese for the Military Services and an American Army officer who served as the 12th Chief of Chaplains of the United States Army from 1967 to 1971. His real-life story of rescuing a young soldier, Frederick "Fritz" Niland, became the inspiration for the film Saving Private Ryan.

Life

Francis L. Sampson was born on 29 February 1912, in Cherokee, Iowa. He attended the University of Notre Dame, graduating in 1936 with an A.B. degree, and then entered the St. Paul Seminary at Saint Paul, Minnesota, where he completed a B.S. degree in theology in 1941. He was ordained to the Roman Catholic priesthood for the Des Moines, Iowa, diocese on June 1, 1941. Following his ordination, Father Sampson served briefly as a parish priest in Neola, Iowa, and also taught at Dowling High School in Des Moines.

Sampson received permission from his bishop, the Most Reverend Gerald T. Bergan, of Des Moines, Iowa to enter the United States Army as a chaplain. It was at Harvard University, strangely enough, that he really began his odyssey; for it was at Harvard that new Army chaplains received their initial entry training into the Army chaplaincy during World War II. After finishing the course, Sampson volunteered for an airborne assignment. It was also a decision, he wrote later, that was made out of ignorance. "Like a zealous young business man, starting to in a strange town," he admitted, "I was ready to join anything out of a sheer sense of civic duty."

He entered the Army in 1942 and was commissioned. He then joined the 501st Parachute Infantry Regiment, of the 101st Airborne Division, as the regimental chaplain.

Cornelius Ryan in The Longest Day, John Eisenhower in The Bitter Woods, and John Toland in Battle and The Last Hundred Days wrote about the beloved chaplain.

While many saw Sampson as a heroic figure, Sampson remembered in those initial days among the hedgerows of Normandy, "no pair of knees shook more than my own, nor any heart ever beat faster in times of danger."

Members of the 501st PIR were present on D-Day, June 6, 1944. They helped to gain an Allied toehold at Carentan on the coast of France. Chaplain Sampson landed in the Douve River at Saint-Come-du-Mont and stayed with the wounded who could not be moved at a large farmhouse, which had been used at the unit's command post until moved farther away from enemy lines. The area became taken over by units of the 6 Fallschirmjager. He was then taken prisoner by two soldiers, and put up against a wall to be shot.

Sampson recalled that he was so frightened that instead of reciting an Act of Contrition, the usual prayer for the forgiveness of sins, he kept repeating to himself the Catholic blessing before meals: "Bless us, Our Lord, and these Thy gifts, which we are about to receive through Thy bounty through Christ Our Lord, Amen." Rescued at the last minute by a German noncommissioned officer who was Catholic, Chaplain Sampson was escorted to a nearby German intelligence post, where he was interrogated, found harmless and then released.

He returned to the medic station at Basse-Addeville (Saint-Come-du-Mont) and helped treat both German and American wounded soldiers. Sampson was later awarded the Distinguished Service Cross, the nation's second highest American military award, for his selfless help to the soldiers.

During what was supposed to be a well-deserved rest at Mourmelon, there was a surprise assault by German forces through the Ardennes. This was to become the Battle of the Bulge. From the confusion Sampson was taken prisoner again on 19 December 1944. He was sealed in a train for six days without food or water, and the train was also attacked at intervals by American aircraft. Imprisoned in Stalag II A, near Neubrandenburg, Chaplain Sampson was allowed to remain in the enlisted men's prison, rather than the officer's prison, at his own request.

At midnight on 28 April 1945, Russian tanks freed the camp and ended the four months of bitter winter imprisonment. Sampson experienced mass rapes and the complete destruction of Neubrandenburg by the Soviets.

In October 1945, Sampson returned to the United States and Dowling High School in Des Moines. He returned to active duty in July 1946, as a regimental chaplain with the 505th Parachute Infantry Regiment, 82nd Airborne Division.

In 1948, a book was published by The Catholic University of America Press of letters he had written, the book was called the Paratrooper Padre. It is about his time with the 101st Airborne from D-day to VE-day. The following years saw him serve a number of important posts. He was regimental chaplain with the 187th Airborne Infantry Regiment, from 1947 to 1951. He served in Korea until he was sent home in 1951. Then he served as an instructor at the U.S. Army Chaplain School at Fort Slocum, New York, until 1954. From 1955 to 1958 he served as the 11th Airborne Division chaplain.

In 1961, Sampson was promoted to full colonel. He served as Seventh Army Chaplain from 1962 to 1965 and then as the USCONARC Staff Chaplain in 1965. The next year he was appointed as the Deputy Chief of Chaplains of the United States Army and promoted to the rank of brigadier general. Sampson was a highly decorated airborne hero of both World War II and the Korean War. He served as Chief of Chaplains from 1967 until his retirement in 1971.

After his retirement Sampson was installed as pastor of Saint Mary's Catholic Church, Shenandoah, Iowa, on 1 September 1971. He was national president of the USO from 1971 to 1974, and from 1983 to 1987 was assistant to the president of Notre Dame as Director of ROTC.

After retiring to Sioux Falls, South Dakota, Monsignor Sampson died of cancer there at age 83 on January 28, 1996. He is buried at St. Catharine's Cemetery in Luverne, Minn., and his grave marker says: "Lord, make me an instrument of your peace."

"Pray for me, as I will thee, that we may merrily meet in heaven" – Francis L. Sampson.

Two years after his death the film Saving Private Ryan was released. This film is based on one of the missions Sampson completed during his military career.

Awards and decorations

References

External links

1912 births
1996 deaths
People from Cherokee, Iowa
University of Notre Dame alumni
Saint Paul Seminary School of Divinity alumni
20th-century American Roman Catholic priests
United States Army personnel of World War II
World War II chaplains
Recipients of the Distinguished Service Cross (United States)
United States Army personnel of the Korean War
Korean War chaplains
United States Army generals
Chiefs of Chaplains of the United States Army
People from Sioux Falls, South Dakota
Deaths from cancer in South Dakota
Military personnel from Iowa